East Asian punctuation can refer to:

 Chinese punctuation
 Japanese punctuation
 Korean punctuation
 CJK Symbols and Punctuation (Unicode block)